Quebracho blanco  may refer to:

 Aspidosperma quebracho-blanco, South American tree species in the family Apocynaceae
 Schinopsis haenkeana, South American tree species in the family Anacardiaceae

See also
 Quebracho tree